A Shared History of Tragedy is the second album from Canadian rock band The Black Maria.

Track listing
 "The Perilous Curse" – 3:50
 "Waking Up with Wolves" – 3:46
 "Nothing Comes Easy But You" – 3:26
 "Van Gogh" – 3:41
 "A Call to Arms" – 3:36
 "Lucid" – 3:31
 "The Concubine" – 4:05
 "Living Expenses" – 4:38
 "Fool's Gold" – 2:49
 "A Thief in the Ranks (Your Bike)" – 5:32
 "11:11" – 3:20

References

The Black Maria albums
2006 albums
Victory Records albums